Tim Tyler's Luck (1937) is a Universal movie serial based on the comic strip Tim Tyler's Luck.

Premise
Tim Tyler stows away on a ship bound for Africa to find his father, Professor James Tyler.  He meets, and is joined by, Lora Lacey, who is chasing the criminal "Spider" Webb, the man responsible for framing her brother.

Cast
 Frankie Thomas as Tim Tyler
 Frances Robinson as Lora Lacey, posing as Lora Graham
 Norman Willis as "Spider" Webb
 Jack Mulhall as Sargeant Gates
 Al Shean as Professor James Tyler, Tim's father
 Anthony Warde as Garry Drake
 Earl Douglas as Jules Lazarre
 William 'Billy' Benedict as Spud
 Frank Mayo as Jim Conway
 Alan Gregg as Brent, one of Spider's henchman
 Stanley Blystone as Captain Clark
 Everett Brown as Mogu, Spider's native henchman
 Skippy as Ju Ju, the Chimp

Critical reception
Author Raymond William Stedman considers Tim Tyler's Luck to be perhaps the best of Universal's "Jungle Thrillers."  Tim Tyler's Luck has good direction and convincing performances.  The serial has quiet moments balancing the action, which was rare for a serial.  The characterization is more nuanced than "might have been expected in an action serial".

Chapter titles
 Jungle Pirates
 Dead Man's Pass
 Into the Lions' Den
 The Ivory Trail
 Trapped in the Quicksands
 The Jaws of the Jungle
 The King of the Gorillas
 The Spider Caught
 The Gates of Doom
 A Race for a Fortune
 No Man's Land
 The Kimberley Diamonds
Source:

DVD release
All 12 chapters were released on a single DVD on February 28, 2006 with special features including a 2005 interview with Frankie Thomas, bios, the original theatrical trailer, and bonus classic cliffhanger trailers.

See also
 List of film serials
 List of film serials by studio

References

External links

1937 films
1937 adventure films
American black-and-white films
1930s English-language films
Films based on comic strips
Films directed by Ford Beebe
Films set in Africa
Universal Pictures film serials
American adventure films
1930s American films